Robert Lawrence (died 4 May 1535) was one of the Forty Martyrs of England and Wales. He was hanged, drawn, and quartered at Tyburn for declining to sign the Oath of Supremacy. His feast day is 4 May.

Life
Born about 1485, Robert Lawrence was a graduate of Cambridge. After joining the Carthusians, in 1531, he succeeded John Houghton as Prior of the Beauvale Priory, Nottinghamshire, when Houghton was appointed Prior of the London Charterhouse.

By February 1535 Parliament declared that everyone had to take the Oath of Supremacy, declaring King Henry VIII to be Supreme Head of the Church of England. Lawrence went with Houghton to see Thomas Cromwell, who had them arrested and placed in the Tower of London. When they refused to sign the Oath of Supremacy, they were hanged, drawn and quartered at Tyburn, making them among the first Carthusian martyrs in England.

Beatified in 1886, Robert was canonized by Pope Paul VI with thirty-nine other martyrs on 25 October 1970.

See also
Richard Reynolds
 Forty Martyrs of England and Wales
 Carthusian Martyrs of London
 Carthusian Martyrs

References

External links
Catholic Forum
Arco, Anna. "Vatican approves English feast days", Catholic Herald, 20 July 2010

Forty Martyrs of England and Wales
Year of birth missing
1535 deaths
Canonizations by Pope Paul VI
English saints
English Roman Catholic saints
Carthusian Martyrs of London
Carthusian saints
People executed by Tudor England by hanging, drawing and quartering
16th-century Christian saints
16th-century Roman Catholic martyrs
Executed English people
People executed under Henry VIII